Black Roses is the seventh studio album by the Finnish rock band The Rasmus, which was released on 29 September 2008 in the UK. In Germany the album was released on 26 September and in the Nordic countries two days before. The album immediately replaced Metallica's Death Magnetic on the top spot of the Finnish Album Charts and went gold after one week. , an estimated of 350,000 copies of the album have been sold worldwide.

Background
According to Dynasty Recordings' MySpace profile, the band rested in Helsinki during the winter 2006 and also wrote songs for the upcoming album. They had met the producer Desmond Child at a concert in Dominican Republic 3 November. Guitarist Pauli Rantasalmi told The Rasmus had written around 30 songs, 11 of which were chosen for the album. The band started recording the new album in Dynasty Studios, Helsinki, Finland 17 September 2007 for a month and in the end of the year went to Nashville to go on. Smaller parts were recorded in Stockholm, Singapore, Berlin and Greece too. While Desmond Child was the main producer, he was helped by Harry Sommerdahl. Michael Wagener was the mixer for Black Roses except "Livin' in a World Without You", which was mixed by Niclas Flyckt. The album was originally planned to be released in March, but was delayed due to new songs the band still wanted to record, including "Livin' in a World Without You". The album's sound is generally less heavy than that of Hide from the Sun. However, a few of the album's songs, such as "Ten Black Roses", "The Fight", and "Lost and Lonely", contain symphonic rock/metal elements.
It's also around that year that another song has been released, called "Yesterday You Threw Away Tomorrow", often affiliated with this album.

Singles
The first single "Livin' in a World Without You" was released on 10 September and for radio stations in July. The music video for "Livin' in a World Without You" was shot on 3 July in Stockholm, and released in August. The song was first played live on 5 July in NRJ in the Park in Berlin together with another new song, "Ten Black Roses".

The second single will be "Justify", released later in autumn. It is quite low, dark and emotional song with some Depeche Mode influences. The Depeche Mode influence is only weak to this song especially, and can be attributed more generally to the music of The Rasmus. But parts of the melody line is an echo of The Cure hit song "Lullaby". This shows particularly in the first and last 30 seconds of the song.

Lauri Ylönen stated on the Austrian television station Go TV, that the duet with Anette Olzon (Nightwish) was to be released later in 2009. The title of song is "October & April". It was released in November 2009.

Touring
The first time The Rasmus played any new songs from Black Roses was the gig in Berlin on 5 July.
The group started the promotion for Black Roses with acoustic gigs at Radio SAW and RS2 in Germany 26–27 August. The Black Roses world tour started in January 2009 in Europe. In Finland they did a tour called Dynasty Tour 2008 in October 2008 together with Von Hertzen Brothers and Mariko starting from Seinäjoki and finishing in Helsinki. The Black Roses tour so far contained concerts in more than twenty-four countries, while some concerts in South America had to be cancelled because of the outbreak of the severe swine flu.
Between June 14 and June 28, 2009 The Rasmus played together with Alice Cooper and Scorpions on a short stadium tour in Russia called "Monsters of Rock". In the summer months of 2009 the band played several festivals.

Track listing

Bonus DVD special fan edition
 "Making of Black Roses"

Charts

Release history

References

The Rasmus albums
2008 albums